Branti parish is an administrative unit of Smiltene Municipality, Latvia. Prior to the 2009 administrative reforms it was part of Valka District.

Towns, villages and settlements of Branti parish

References 

Parishes of Latvia
Smiltene Municipality